Rear Admiral Harold Hyam Glass  (21 August 1918 – 29 March 1989) was an Australian judge and naval officer. He served on the Supreme Court of New South Wales, the New South Wales Court of Appeal and was Judge Advocate General for the Royal Australian Navy (RAN).

Early life and military service
Glass was born in Sydney on 21 August 1918, the son of lawyer S. B. Glass. He excelled as a student of Sydney Boys High School (1930–34), and on completion of his secondary studies took an Arts Degree at the University of Sydney, majoring in French and German. During his time at the University of Sydney, he shared the medal in philosophy with the eminent twentieth century philosopher John Leslie Mackie. Glass left the RAN in 1946 with the rank of lieutenant.

Legal career
Returning to Sydney after the end of the Second World War, Glass took his Bachelor of Laws degree at the University of Sydney, and articled at Lieberman & Tobias for two years before being admitted to the New South Wales Bar in 1948. He practised at the bar until his appointment to the bench at the Supreme Court of New South Wales in 1973, taking silk in 1962, and sitting as President of the New South Wales Bar Association in 1973. He was appointed a Judge of Appeal in 1974, a position he retained until 1987.

Naval career
Glass rejoined the RAN in 1966 as a commander Special Branch, Australian Royal Navy Reserve (ARNR) as a member of the Reserve Legal Panel. In 1969, Glass served as Australia's leading counsel in the joint RAN-United States Navy Board of Inquiry following the collision between the Australian aircraft carrier  and the American destroyer . Glass was promoted to the rank of captain in 1963. He was appointed to the office of Judge Advocate-General in 1978, and was promoted to rear admiral in 1980, shortly before he was placed on the retired list. He continued to serve as the Judge Advocate-General for the Navy until 1983.

Academic and other work
Glass lectured in contracts and torts at the University of Sydney soon after he graduated, and later he lectured in procedure. After he retired, he became a visiting professor at the University of New South Wales. He was the co-author of The Liability of Employers, described by the NSW Bar Association's Bar News as "one of the few really first rate Australian legal treatises", and the editor of the Essays on Evidence. In addition, he contributed articles to the leading legal journals.

Glass also, under the pen name Benjamin Sidney, published two works of legal fiction, Discord Within The Bar in 1981, and Sherman for the Plaintiff in 1987. The Harold H. Glass Memorial Prize was established at the University of Western Australia to honour the memory of Glass, and is awarded each year to the most able student in the subject of Torts.

Glass died on 29 March 1989, in Sydney. At his funeral, Rabbi Raymond Apple of the Great Synagogue, Sydney, described him as a "quintessential judge, learned lawyer, loyal Australian, faithful Jew, broadminded human being, cultured citizen of the world."

References

1918 births
1989 deaths
Military personnel from New South Wales
20th-century Australian lawyers
Australian Jews
Australian King's Counsel
Judges of the Supreme Court of New South Wales
Officers of the Order of Australia
Royal Australian Navy admirals
Royal Australian Navy personnel of World War II